Clan War is a 1998 board game published by Alderac Entertainment Group.

Gameplay
Clan War is a game in which a miniatures game takes place in the fantasy setting of the Legend of the Five Rings.

Reception
The online second version of Pyramid  reviewed Clan War and commented that "Much like the Legend of the Five Rings collectible card and roleplaying games, Alderac Entertainment Group's Clan War, a miniatures combat game in the same setting, is almost Zen-like in its elegance and simplicity."

Reviews
Backstab #24

References

Alderac Entertainment Group games
Board games introduced in 1998
Legend of the Five Rings